Autocrat, LLC (now named Finlay Extracts and Ingredients USA (Finlays)) is a coffee and tea extracts manufacturing company based in Lincoln, Rhode Island, United States. The company's coffee syrups are often used to make coffee milk, which was made the official state drink of Rhode Island in 1993. The company's name change occurred in 2015, and its retail products remain marketed under the Autocrat brand name.

History
Autocrat, LLC was established in 1895 under the name Brownell & Field Coffee Company, and began manufacturing coffee syrup in the 1930s. In 1991, the firm acquired Eclipse, a coffee syrup manufacturer, after which it became the sole manufacturer of coffee syrup in the United States. In January 2012, the firm partnered with RFI, LLC to expand coffee product offerings.  In April 2014, the company was acquired by James Finlay Limited, a British tea extract producer,   and continued to operate under the Autocrat name. In July 2015, the company's corporate name was changed to Finlay Extracts and Ingredients USA (Finlays). Retail products remain marketed under the Autocrat brand name.

Products
The company produces a brand of coffee syrup under the Autocrat name, and also as Coffee Time Syrup, and after the acquisition of Eclipse in 1991, it also continued to manufacture coffee syrup under the Eclipse brand name.  It also manufactures and markets frozen and powdered coffee and tea extracts and concentrates.

Autocrat and Coffee Connection collaborated to invent the Frappuccino in 1992, and in 1994 Starbucks acquired all of the 23 Coffee Connection locations, along with the trademark rights to the "Frappuccino" name.

In December 2013, Narragansett Brewing Company marketed a limited edition stout brewed with Autocrat Coffee syrup.

See also

References

External links

 

Coffee companies of the United States
Coffee brands
Food and drink companies established in 1895
1895 establishments in Rhode Island
2014 mergers and acquisitions
Food and drink companies disestablished in 2014
2014 disestablishments in Rhode Island